Anna Camner, born 1977, is a Swedish contemporary artist, based in Stockholm. Camner is a painter, known for her intense and meticulously executed paintings in oil on plexi glass board. She holds a master's degree from The Royal Academy of Art in Stockholm. Camner has exhibited in Stockholm, New York and London, and was the recipient of the Beckers Art Award in 2017.

Anna Camner's earlier work was focused on dark Vanitas themes; the paintings used to burst with foliage, flowers, insects, spider webs, snails and rodents, all in various stages of decay. The new body of work from 2015-2016 marks a clear departure from that. Conceptually, the artist still moves in the dark borderland between life and death, but her subjects, always painted against a solid pitch black background, have been refined, given a stronger focus and a minimalist character, along with a sense of inherent mystery and uncertainty about whether the depicted subject is in fact alive or dead matter. The new body of work was exhibited in Stockholm and reviewed in a number of Swedish newspapers, such as Dagens Industri, Expressen,  and Svenska Dagbladet.

In 2012, Wanås Konst Förlag published a picture book with the works of Anna Camner, titled The Sick Rose.

Bibliography
The Sick Rose (2012) , Wanås konst

References

External links 
images of Camner's work on MutualArt

Living people
1977 births
21st-century Swedish women artists
21st-century Swedish artists
Artists from Stockholm
Swedish contemporary artists
Swedish women painters
Swedish painters